Falsuszafrona is a genus of sea snails, marine gastropod mollusks in the family Columbellidae.

Species
Species within the genus Falsuszafrona include:
 Falsuszafrona belkisae (Espinosa & Ortea, 2007)
 Falsuszafrona dicomata (Dall, 1889)
 Falsuszafrona diversa (Espinosa, Ortea & Fernández-Garcés, 2007)
 Falsuszafrona idalina (Duclos, 1840)
 Falsuszafrona incerta (Stearns, 1892)
 Falsuszafrona lindae (Petuch, 1992)
 Falsuszafrona pseudopulchella Pelorce, 2020
 Falsuszafrona pulchella (Blainville, 1829)
 Falsuszafrona sunderlandi (Petuch, 1987)
 Falsuszafrona taylorae (Petuch, 1987)
 Falsuszafrona tortugana (Garcia, 2015)

References

 Pelorce J. (2020). Les Columbellidae collectés dans les eaux profondes autour de l'île de Guadeloupe (Antilles Françaises) pendant la campagne KARUBENTHOS 2 (2015) du Muséum National d'Histoire Naturelle. Iberus. 38(1): 55-111 page(s): 60

Columbellidae
Gastropod genera